David Lindenmayer, is an Australian scientist and academic. His research focuses on the adoption of nature conservation practices in agricultural production areas, developing ways to improve integration of native forest harvesting and biodiversity conservation, new approaches to enhance biodiversity conservation in plantations, and improved fire management practices in Australia. He specialises in large-scale, long-term research monitoring programs in south-eastern Australia, primarily in forests, reserves, national parks, plantations, and on farm land. 

Lindenmayer is a Professor of Ecology and Conservation Biology at the Australian National University's Fenner School of Environment and Society. He has published more than 800 peer-reviewed scientific papers and 46 books on a wide range of topics associated with forestry, woodlands, wildlife and biodiversity conservation, and ecologically sustainable natural resource management. He is among the world’s most highly cited forest ecologists and conservation biologists. His areas of expertise also include environmental management, forestry management and environment, terrestrial ecology, wildlife and habitat management, environmental monitoring,  forestry fire management, natural resource management, zoology and forestry sciences, with a particular focus on the critically endangered Leadbeater's possum. His work on wildlife conservation and biodiversity has, for many years, led world research in this area. Lindenmayer's conservation and biodiversity research has been recognised through numerous awards, including the Eureka Science Prize, and the Australian Natural History Medallion by the Field Naturalists Club of Victoria. He was appointed an Officer of the Order of Australia "for distinguished service to conservation and the environment in the field of landscape ecology, to tertiary education, and to professional organisations".

Academic career
 2018 Robert H. Whittaker Distinguished Ecologist Award
 2012 	Australian Research Council Laureate Fellowship
 2009 Australian Ecology Research Award
 2008	FAA - Elected Fellow of the Australian Academy of Science
 2003	DSc - The Australian National University. Accepted May 2003; conferred December 2003
 1990	PhD - The Australian National University: "The ecology and habitat requirements of Leadbeater's Possum"
 1986	DipEd - University of Adelaide
 1982	BSc - The Australian National University

Publications

Lindenmayer has published over 800 peer-reviewed scientific papers. He has authored 46 books either solely or in collaboration with others, including

 2019 Rocky Outcrops in Australia: Ecology, Conservation and Management CSIRO Publishing
 2018 Restoring Farm Woodlands for Wildlife CSIRO Publishing
 2018 Effective Ecological Monitoring CSIRO Publishing
 2018 Monitoring Threatened Species and Ecological Communities CSIRO Publishing
 2016 Wildlife Conservation in Farm Landscapes CSIRO Publishing
 2015 Mountain Ash: Fire, Logging and the Future of Victoria's Giant Forests CSIRO Publishing
 2015 Indicators and Surrogates of Biodiversity and Environmental Change CSIRO Publishing
 2014 Ten Commitments Revisited: Securing Australia's Future Environment CSIRO Publishing
 2014 Booderee National Park. The Jewel of Jervis Bay CSIRO Publishing
 2013 Melbourne's Water Catchments. Perspectives on a world class water supply CSIRO Publishing
 2011 Planting for Wildlife: A Practical Guide to Restoring Native Woodlands. CSIRO Publishing
 2011 What Makes a Good Farm for Wildlife? CSIRO Publishing
 2010 Forest Phoenix. How a Great Forest Recovers After Wildfire CSIRO Publishing
 2010 Reptiles of the NSW Murray Catchment: A Guide to Their Identification, Ecology and Conservation CSIRO Publishing
 2010 Effective Ecological Monitoring CSIRO Publishing
 2009 Australia’s Biodiversity and Climate Change CSIRO Publishing
 2009 Large-Scale Landscape Experiments. Lessons from Tumut Cambridge University Press
 2009 Forest Pattern and Ecological Process: A Synthesis of 25 Years of Research CSIRO Publishing
 2008 Salvage Logging and Its Ecological Consequences CSIRO Publishing
 2007 On Borrowed Time. Australia’s Biodiversity Crisis CSIRO Publishing and Penguin
 2007 Saving the Earth as a Career: Advice on Becoming a Conservation Professional Blackwells Publishers
 2006 Habitat Fragmentation and Landscape Change Island Press
 2006 Life in the Tall Eucalypt Forests New Holland Publishers
 2005 Woodlands: A Disappearing Landscape CSIRO Publishing
 2005 Practical Conservation Biology CSIRO Publishing
 2004 Trees and Biodiversity. A Guide for Farm Forestry Rural Industries Research and Development Corporation
 2003 Wildlife on Farms. How to Conserve Native Animals CSIRO Publishing
 2002 Wildlife, Fire and Future Climate: A forest ecosystem analysis CSIRO Publishing
 2002 Conserving Forest Biodiversity: A Comprehensive Multiscaled Approach Island Press
 2002 Gliders of Australia. A Natural History University of NSW Press
 2002 Tree Hollows and Wildlife Conservation in Australia CSIRO Publishing
 1998 Conservation Biology for the Australian Environment Surrey Beatty and Sons
 1996 Wildlife and Woodchips: Leadbeater's Possum as a Testcase of Sustainable Forestry University of New South Wales Press
 1995 The Risk of Extinction: Ranking Management Options for Leadbeater's Possum Centre for Resource and Environmental Studies

In addition, Lindenmayer has edited and contributed chapters to:

 2013 Biodiversity and Environmental Change: Monitoring, Challenges and Direction CSIRO Publishing
 2012 Land Use Intensification. Effects on Agriculture, Biodiversity and Ecological Processes CSIRO Publishing
 2012 Biodiversity Monitoring in Australia CSIRO Publishing
 2010 Temperate Woodland Conservation and Management. CSIRO Publishing
 2008 10 Commitments: Reshaping the Lucky Country’s Environment CSIRO Publishing
 2007 Managing and Designing Landscapes for Conservation: Moving from Perspectives to Principles Blackwell Publishing
 2003 Towards Forest Sustainability Island Press
 2003 Australia Burning: Fire Ecology, Policy and Management Issues CSIRO Publishing

References

Academic staff of the Australian National University
Living people
Fellows of the Australian Academy of Science
Year of birth missing (living people)
Officers of the Order of Australia